The position of the Head of the Udmurt Republic is the highest office within the Government of the Udmurt Republic in Russia. The Head is elected by citizens of Russia residing in the republic. Term of service is five years.

List

Elections 
The latest election for the office was held on 10 September 2017

References

External links
Russian republics

 
Politics of Udmurtia
Udmurt Republic